Dylan Jennings (born 14 September 1979) is a South African former cricketer who played 34 first-class and 36 List A matches between 1999 and 2004.

References

External links
 

1979 births
Living people
South African cricketers
Easterns cricketers
Gauteng cricketers
Cricketers from Johannesburg